Anabathmis is a genus of sunbirds.

Species
It contains three species:

The name is Greek for step or stair.

References 

 
Bird genera